Michael John Cooper (1930 – 31 March 2018) was an American historian. Briefly a Jesuit himself, Cooper wrote extensively on 15th- and 16th-century encounters between Jesuit missionaries and Japan. He was editor of the journal Monumenta Nipponica in Tokyo for 26 years (1971–1996) and was also formerly a president of the Asiatic Society of Japan.

Works
 They came to Japan: An Anthology of European Reports on Japan 1543–1640, University of California Press, 1965
 The Southern barbarians : the first Europeans in Japan, Tokyo ; Palo Alto, Calif. : Kodansha International in cooperation with Sophia University, 1971
 This Island of Japon: Joao Rodrigues’s Account of 16th Century Japan, Kodansha International, 1973
 Rodrigues the Interpreter: An Early Jesuit in Japan and China, Weatherhill, 1974
 Exploring Kamakura : a guide for the curious traveler, Weatherhill, 1979
 Catalogue of rare books in the Library of the Japan Foundation, Office for the Japanese Studies Center, The Foundation, 1986.
 'The Early Europeans and Tea', in Paul Varley and Kumakura Isao, eds., Tea in Japan: Essays on the History of Chanoyu, Honolulu: University of Hawaii Press, 1989
 'Early Western-style Paintings in Japan', in John Breen and Mark Williams, eds., Japan and Christianity: Impacts and Responses, St Martin's Press, 1996
 The Japanese Mission to Europe, 1582–1590: The Journey of Four Samurai Boys through Portugal, Spain and Italy, Global Oriental, 2005.

References

1930 births
2018 deaths
20th-century American Jesuits
21st-century American Jesuits
Historians of Japan
American Japanologists
Jesuit historians and chroniclers